Idaho Legislative District 18 is one of 35 districts of the Idaho Legislature. It is currently represented by Janie Ward-Engelking, Democrat  of Boise, Ilana Rubel, Democrat of Boise, and Brooke Green, Democrat of Boise.

District profile (2012–present) 
District 18 currently consists of a portion of Ada County.

District profile (2002–2012) 
From 2002 to 2012, District 18 consisted of a portion of Ada County.

District profile (1992–2002) 
From 1992 to 2002, District 18 consisted of a portion of Ada County.

See also

 List of Idaho Senators
 List of Idaho State Representatives

References

External links
Idaho Legislative District Map (with members)
Idaho Legislature (official site)

18
Ada County, Idaho